Megalo Eleftherochori is a village and a community of the Elassona municipality. Before the 2011 local government reform it was a part of the municipality of Potamia, of which it was a municipal district. The 2011 census recorded 584 inhabitants in the village. The community of Megalo Eleftherochori covers an area of 40.779 km2. Within the bounds of the community is the site of the ancient town of Ericinium.

Economy
The population of Megalo Eleftherochori is occupied in animal husbandry and agriculture (mainly tobacco).

Population
According to the 2011 census, the population of the settlement of Megalo Eleftherochori was 584 people, a decrease of almost 22% compared with the population of the previous census of 2001.

See also
 List of settlements in the Larissa regional unit

References

Populated places in Larissa (regional unit)